Roger Louis Faulques (14 December 1924 – 6 November 2011)  René Faulques, was a French Army Colonel, a graduate of the École spéciale militaire de Saint-Cyr, a paratrooper officer of the French Foreign Legion, and a mercenary. He fought in World War II, the First Indochina War, the Suez Crisis, the Algerian War, the Congo Crisis, the North Yemen Civil War and the Nigerian Civil War. He is one of France's most decorated soldiers.

Early career 
Faulques was a maquis resistance fighter in 1944 and took part in the last battles of World War II in the French First Army. As a Corporal, he received the Croix de Guerre at the age of 20. Noted for his fighting spirit and sense of command, he was admitted to the Military School of Saint-Cyr, which had changed its terms of recruitment to overcome the lack of officers in the French army at the end of World War II. In 1946 he was promoted to 2nd Lieutenant and was assigned, at his own request, to the Foreign Legion, within the 3rd Régiment Etranger d'Infanterie      (3rd Foreign Infantry Regiment).

First Indochina War 
Faulques served in the First Indochina War as a Lieutenant with the 1er BEP (1st Foreign Parachute Battalion) and participated in the struggles of this unit until its destruction in October 1950. On 26 February 1948, in command of a group of legionaries, Faulques was ambushed on Route Coloniale 3. Having lost half of his legionaries, Faulques led his men in hand-to-hand fighting until wounded in both feet by a machine gun bullet. His legionaries evacuated Faulques in extremis from the line of fire. Repatriated to the mainland for treatment, at the age of 23 Faulques was appointed a Chevalier of the légion d'honneur and held five citations.

After recovering from his wounds, Faulques saw action in the Battle of RC 4, when he was placed in command of the training platoon of 1er BEP, which lost nearly 80% of its force during the evacuation of Cao Bang in September and October 1950. Seriously wounded four times during this battle (right shoulder shattered by bullets, chest opened by a volley, left elbow and right femur shattered by bullets), he lay on the ground for three days, left for dead. Having survived, Faulques was captured by the Vietminh who, judging him mortally wounded, released Faulques to the French authorities with other gravely injured prisoners. Mentioned in dispatches Faulques was made an Officer of the légion d'honneur for exceptional services and was again repatriated to France. His injuries required him to spend several years in the Val-de-Grâce military hospital.

Algerian War 

Ending the war in Indochina with six wounds and eight citations, Faulques then served in French Algeria as an intelligence officer of the 1er REP during the Battle of Algiers. He was accused of  torture in Algeria and proved to be effective in the dismantling of several networks of the FLN.

Congo Crisis 

Faulques and Captain Yves de La Bourdonnaye were given leave by army minister Pierre Messmer, and left to provide support to the Belgian-backed Katangese Gendarmerie against the Republic of Congo-Leopoldville, joining hundreds of other British, Rhodesian, French, and South African mercenary and voluntary irregulars in replacing the 117 Belgian officers, and other white volunteers of Belgian descent. Especially notable among the French mercenaries were professional career soldiers who had fought in the Algerian War, which of course included Faulques.

Following his deposition and kidnapping, Congolese-Leopoldville Prime Minister Patrice Lumumba was assassinated by the Katangese with the direct support of Belgium, and the indirect support of the CIA. Katangese military officer Moise Tshombe then declared himself president.

Lumumba’s death resulted in mass protests, which were not only confined to the Congo. Indian PM Jawaharlal Nehru condemned the assassination as “an international crime of the first magnitude”, and urged greater UN involvement, deploying the 4,700 strong 99th Indian Infantry Brigade as UN peacekeepers in March in order to keep foreign combatants out of the country. Nehru’s Indian forces under the command of Brigadier-General Raja attacked the Katangan capital of Elisabethville on 13 September 1961 in Operation Morthor. During this attack Indian soldiers assaulted the lightly defended post office and killed all of its Katangan occupants. According to Ian Colvin who was an eyewitness, the attack was “needlessly brutal.” In response to this, serious fighting soon broke out as Katanga’s self-declared President Moise Tshombe encouraged both Katangese civilians and foreign mercenaries to go on the offensive against UN forces. Prior to this on the 5 April 1961, UN Secretary-General Dag Hammarskjöld criticised Belgian mercenaries for their service in Katanga and condemned Tshombe for turning the Katangese public against the United Nations. The counterattack to Operation Morthor included the siege of Jadotville led by Faulques, Michel de Clary, and Henri Lasimone.

The siege of Jadotville lasted 5 days. At the end of the battle, 155 Irish soldiers under Commandant Pat Quinlan surrendered to Faulques and his 3000–5000 Katangan force on 17 September having run out of ammunition. During the action the UN forces had inflicted heavy casualties on the Katangans and their mercenary allies (300 dead, 1000 wounded), with only minimal casualties of their own (5 wounded).

In all, the failure of Operation Morthor was used in arguments both against the deployment of UN peacekeepers, and for the strengthening of such forces. On September 18, UN Secretary-General Dag Hammarskjöld's plane crashed over Zambia en route to negotiate a ceasefire between ONUC and the Katangese, prompting much speculation over the suspicious nature of his death, including the possibility that his plane was shot down by a fighter plane piloted by a Belgian mercenary working for self-declared President Tshombe. Hammarskjöld was succeeded by U Thant.

In December 1961, UN troops launched Operation Unokat in order to regain control of the situation, against which the defence strategy was designed by Faulques. Operation Unokat applied significant pressure on the rebel state, and eventually Tshombe relented and signed the Kitona Declaration. When in 1962 violence began to flare up again, Katangan gendarmes attacked peacekeeping forces in Katanga on 24 December in response to which, UN Secretary General Thant authorized the retaliatory offensive, Operation Grandslam. Swedish air support and heavy mortar fire engaged the mercenaries, after which Swedish peacekeepers entered the Katangese capital Elizabethville, followed by the Indian brigade of General Raja, defeating the Katangese forces and securing the capital by 28 December. After a year of guerrilla insurgency, Tshombe, realizing that his position was untenable, sued for peace on 15 January 1963. Two days later he signed an instrument of surrender and declared the Katangan secession to be over.

Other mercenary work 
Faulques continued his mercenary career, alongside his friend Bob Denard, first being deployed in North Yemen from August 1963 to the end of 1964, in support of MI6 (British intelligence), then in Biafra on behalf of the French government. According to David Smiley in Arabian Assignment  (page 156), the French and Belgian mercenaries alternated in the early 1960s between the Yemeni and Congo theatres since in the Congo they had women and alcohol at will but were rarely paid, while in Yemen they were paid but were deprived of women and alcohol.

In popular culture 
Faulques served as a model for certain characters in the novels of Jean Lartéguy, Les Centurions, Les Prétoriens (The Praetorians) and Les Chimères Noires (The Hounds of Hell) and in Declan Power's 2005 book “The Siege of Jadotville”.  

Faulques is portrayed by the French actor Guillaume Canet in the 2016 film The Siege of Jadotville.

In 2010, Faulques was honoured at the Foreign Legion's Camerone ceremony.

Ribbons

Decorations 
 Grand officier de la Légion d'honneur (Decree of 16 April 2004. Commandeur, 19 July 1960)
 Croix de Guerre 1939-1945 with 1 citation (bronze star)
 Croix de guerre des théâtres d'opérations extérieures (Croix de guerre for Theatres of External Operations) with 8 citations (5 bronze palm, two silver stars, bronze star) (Indochina)
 Croix de la Valeur militaire with 3 citations (2 vermeil stars and silver star) (Algeria)
 Croix du combattant
 Insigne des blessés militaires (Medal for wounded military) with 6 red stars
  Médaille coloniale with "EXTREME-ORIENT" campaign clasp (Indochina)
 Médaille commémorative (Commemorative Medal) 1939-1945
 Médaille commémorative de la guerre d'Indochine (Commemorative Medal of the Indochina War)
 Médaille commémorative des opérations de Suez (Commemorative Medal, Suez Operation)
 Médaille commémorative des opérations de sécurité et de maintien de l'ordre en AFN (Commemorative Medal for security operations in North Africa (Algeria)

Foreign decorations
 Officer of the Lao Order of the Million Elephants and the White Parasol
 Officer of the Taï Order of Civil Merit
 Thai Military Merit decoration
  Indochina Cross of Valour with 1 citation (bronze star)

References

 The Mercenaries 1960-1980 Historia; Special Issue 406 bis (1980).
 Pierre Lunel, Bob Denard, King of Fortune. First edition, 1991. Regarding Yemen, in this book the spotlight is given to the French while the essential role of the British, who were the organizers and contractors is obscured. So the colonel of SAS  it appears as a simple "English radioman", and Colonel David Smiley is mentioned only once (page 244) (photographs).
  Written by an officer who participated in the field, to British intervention on behalf of MI6, Oman (1958-1961) and Yemen (1963-1967). Notebook with photographs.
 Colonel David Smiley Irregular Regular, Michael Russell, Norwich, 1994.
  All MI6 operations are detailed. Chapter 19 is devoted to Albania ("Project Valuable"), chapter 30 deals with Oman and Muscat, Chapter 31 with Yemen. Index online

External links
 Photographed in 2005 at the funeral of a legionnaire paratrooper
 Mercenaries. Katanga, September 1961, Portrait of Colonel René FAULQUES, grenade in hand and cigarette in mouth. Getty Images. 1 September 1961

1924 births
2011 deaths
French mercenaries
French military personnel
Grand Officiers of the Légion d'honneur
Recipients of the Croix de Guerre 1939–1945 (France)
French Resistance members